MLB Game of the Week Live on YouTube is the presentation of Major League Baseball (MLB) games live on the video sharing and social media platform YouTube. Games are produced by the league-owned MLB Network. Games generally air in the afternoon on weekdays.

History
On April 30, 2019, Major League Baseball and YouTube agreed to a partnership for 13 exclusive baseball games. The agreement was essentially a replacement to an earlier deal with Facebook Watch, which was criticized for requiring a Facebook account to access and for having too clunky of an interface. The YouTube games would feature a pre and post game show, along side the game, all produced by MLB Network. There was no requirement for a YouTube account to access the game. The first game aired was between the Phillies and the Dodgers on July 18, 2019. After the season, MLB said they averaged 130,000 viewers per telecast. The August 7, Dodgers-Cardinals telecast saw the highest peak of 320,000 live viewers.

Because of the COVID-19 pandemic, and the resulting reduction of the 2020 MLB season to 60 games, MLB on YouTube only aired 4 games, all in September, during the 2020 season. Two of these games were exclusive to the platform, while two others aired in tandem with local regional sports networks.

For the 2021 MLB season, MLB on YouTube returned with 21 exclusive games. During the season YouTube produced two special broadcasts. On June 30, YouTube featured a special stat focused statcast broadcast between the Mariners and Blue Jays. YouTube's game between the Orioles and Rays on July 20 featured the first all-female announcing crew on an MLB broadcast. Melanie Newman (play-by-play), Sarah Langs (color commentator), Heidi Watney and Lauren Gardner (pre- and postgame show co-hosts) were back at MLB Network studios while Alanna Rizzo was the reporter at Tropicana Field.

On April 14, 2022, Major League Baseball announced that YouTube would have 15 exclusive games for the 2022 MLB season. Unlike previous years which featured a rotating broadcasting crew, Scott Braun will handle all play–by–play duties and Yonder Alonso will handle all color commentating. For the August 17, 2022 broadcast between the Los Angeles Angels and Seattle Mariners, an alternate broadcast hosted by Lauren Gardner and Cameron Maybin was also produced. The broadcast featured celebrity guests such as Bill Nye, Joel McHale and Kenny Mayne, among others.

Commentators

Play-by-play
Scott Braun (2019–present)
Brian Kenny (2021)
Stephen Nelson (2019–2021)
Melanie Newman (2021)
Matt Vasgersian (2021)
Rich Waltz (2019)

Color commentators

Jeremy Affeldt (2019, 2019)
Yonder Alonso (2021–present)
Geoff Blum (2021)
Eric Byrnes (2019)
Sean Casey (2019–2021)
Ben Davis (2019)
Rajai Davis (2021)
Mark DeRosa (2021)
Matt Diaz (2019)
Tim Dillard (2021)

Shawn Estes (2019, 2021)
Cliff Floyd (2019)
John Franco (2021)
Nomar Garciaparra (2019)
Danny Graves (2021)
Mark Gubicza (2021)
Jeremy Guthrie (2021)
Jerry Hairston (2021)
Orel Hershiser (2019)
LaTroy Hawkins (2021)

Mark Langston (2019)
Al Leiter (2019)
Kyle Lohse (2019)
Justin Maxwell (2019)
Jason Marquis (2019)
Buck Martinez (2019)
Kevin Millar (2020)
Sarah Langs (2021)
Mark Langston (2019)
Justin Morneau (2019)

Carlos Peña (2019, 2022)
Dan Plesac (2019–2021)
Ryan Rowland-Smith (2021)
F. P. Santangelo (2019)
Buck Showalter (2021)
John Smoltz (2020)
Jim Thome (2019)
B.J. Upton (2019)
Tom Verducci (2019, 2021)
Chris Young (2021)

Broadcasts
The pre- and postgame shows are each 30 minutes in duration. The former is done at MLB Network studios while the latter is handled by the broadcasters who also present the Player of the Game trophy which is based on viewer voting.

2021

2022

Viewership
The following is a list of the 10 most viewed MLB Game of the Week Live on YouTube games. Viewership is based on the publicly available viewership counter on YouTube.com.

References

External links
 

YouTube
Sports telecast series
2019 American television series debuts
2010s American television series
2020s American television series
2010s YouTube series
2020s YouTube series
English-language television shows
MLB Network original programming